Hancocks & Co is a retail jeweller in London, founded on 1 January 1849 by Charles F. Hancock, a former partner of Storr and Mortimer. The first shop was opened at a corner of Bruton Street and New Bond Street, in London. It has moved several times since then. Hancocks has become notable for the manufacture of the Victoria Cross medals and also for the various Royal Warrants that it holds.  It has been based in the Burlington Arcade in London since 1998.

History

Hancocks' first gallery opened at a corner of Bruton Street and New Bond Street, in London in 1849. Hancocks subsequently moved in 1917 to Vigo Street, in 1970 to Burlington Gardens and in 1998 to its current location at 52 & 53 Burlington Arcade. Hancocks has exhibited at several renowned exhibitions. The first exhibition that Hancocks attended was the Great Exhibition at the Crystal Palace in 1851. It then participated in international exhibitions at Paris in 1867 and Vienna in 1873 where Hancocks was awarded medals of excellence. Hancocks continues to participate in major exhibitions such as Grosvenor House, Maastricht and New York.

In 1998, Hancocks acquired the business of S.J. Rood, diamond merchants and jewellery manufacturers. S.J. Rood were themselves awarded a Royal Warrant by Mary of Teck, queen consort of King George V, in 1921 and are famous as the creators of the “For....” series of rings which were gifted to Queen Mary’s ladies-in-waiting on their marriage.
Hancocks currently occupy the former S.J. Rood premises in Burlington Arcade.

Royal Appointments and Warrants
On 13 August 1849, after only eight months in business, Hancocks received the Royal Appointment of Queen Victoria. Many of the principal sovereigns of Europe also became regular patrons. There can be little doubt that the rapid expansion by Charles Hancock during the formative years of the Company led to Hancocks being entrusted with the design and production of the Victoria Cross on the inception of the award in 1856. This medal is still made exclusively by Hancocks.

In 1962 the Company was granted the Royal Warrant as Goldsmiths and Silversmiths to Queen Elizabeth The Queen Mother.

S.J. Rood 

S.J. Rood was established in London’s Burlington Arcade in 1873 by the Allen family. From 1900 onwards the firm enjoyed great success with affluent Londoners and was awarded a Royal Warrant by Queen Mary.

It operated independently until it were acquired by Hancocks in 1998.  Hancocks then took over the Rood premises in Burlington Arcade, where they remain trading today.

Current business 
Hancocks, founded in 1849, is still family owned by Stephen and Janie Burton, and is one of London's oldest specialist dealers buying and selling rare and collectable jewels.
They are based in historical premises in The Burlington Arcade in London.

References

External links

 Hancocks website
 

Purveyors to the Imperial and Royal Court
British Royal Warrant holders
Victoria Cross
British jewellers